Kristoffer Arvhage (born 3 November 1977) is a retired Swedish football defender.

References

1977 births
Living people
Swedish footballers
IF Elfsborg players
AaB Fodbold players
AIK Fotboll players
IFK Norrköping players
Association football defenders
Allsvenskan players
Superettan players
Danish Superliga players
Swedish expatriate footballers
Expatriate men's footballers in Denmark
Swedish expatriate sportspeople in Denmark
People from Borås
Sportspeople from Västra Götaland County